Penelope "Penny" Blackmore (born 23 April 1984) is a retired Australian rhythmic gymnast who competed at the 2004 Summer Olympics in Athens.

Early life and education 
Blackmore attended Korowa Anglican Girls' School in Melbourne from 1989. In 1997, her family moved to Sydney, Australia and she relocated to MLC School in Burwood, Sydney. Blackmore later attended the University of Sydney.

Gymnastics career 
Blackmore started rhythmic gymnastics in 1995, after it was suggested to her by a friend of the family. After mixed results from her early career, she was crowned the Australian National All-Around Champion (2nd Hoop, 2nd Clubs, 3rd Ribbon) in 2003, and ranked 57th at the 26th Gymnastics World Championships in Budapest, Hungary, affirming her then position as Australia's foremost gymnast. According to The Daily Telegraph, her strongest finish on the international stage was at the 2004 Rhythmic Gymnastics World Cup, when she finished 10th. 

In 2004, Blackmore again won the Australian National Championships (2nd Hoop, 1st Ball, 2nd Clubs, 1st Ribbon), and thus was given the opportunity to qualify as a wild card entrant in the 2004 Athens Olympic Games. Blackmore's qualification round results were; Ball 19.325, Hoop 19.575, Clubs 19.600, Ribbon 14.550. She debuted at the Olympic Games on 27 August 2004, without making any mistakes in her ball and hoop routines, and finished 22nd in rhythmic gymnastics after day one.

Penny announced her retirement from the sport in December 2004. She currently works at General Assembly.

References

External links
 
 

1984 births
Living people
Australian rhythmic gymnasts
Olympic gymnasts of Australia
Gymnasts at the 2004 Summer Olympics
Sportswomen from Victoria (Australia)
People educated at MLC School
University of Sydney alumni
Sportspeople from Melbourne